Björn Axel Eyvind Bratt (30 June 1907 – 16 January 1987) was a Swedish diplomat.

Early life
Bratt was born on 30 June 1907 in Stockholm, Sweden, the son of Arnold "Arne" Bratt, a lector, and Amy (née Berggren). He began his career as an attaché at the Ministry for Foreign Affairs in 1931.

Career
Bratt was appointed consul in New York City in 1946 and director at the Foreign Ministry in 1947. Bratt was secretary of the Committee on Foreign Affairs in 1949 and earned a Licentiate of Philosophy degree from Uppsala University the same year. He became consul (consul general's name) in Berlin in 1951 and in the same year he earned a Doctor of Philosophy degree from Uppsala University. Bratt was ambassador in Addis Ababa from 1953 to 1959, also accredited to Khartoum from 1957 to 1959, Pretoria from 1959 to 1963, Tehran and Kabul from 1964 to 1967 and finally in Dublin from 1967 to 1973.

Personal life
In 1939, Bratt married Carin Robbert (1915-1984), the daughter of the director Carl Johan Robbert and Ragnhild (née Boman). Bratt remarried in 1963 to Sonia Wyrill. Bratt hade three children from his first marriage: Carl Johan Bratt (born 1940), Aimee Bratt (born 1943) and Carl Gustaf Bratt (born 1955).

Death
Bratt died on 16 January 1987 and was buried in Friedländerska kyrkogården in Gothenburg, Sweden.

Awards and decorations
Bratt's awards:
Commander of the Order of the Polar Star
Grand Cross of the Order of Menelik II
Commander of the Order of the Dannebrog
Officer of the Order of Polonia Restituta
Knight First Class of the Order of the White Rose of Finland
Knight of the Order of the Three Stars

References

Further reading

1907 births
1987 deaths
Consuls-general of Sweden
Ambassadors of Sweden to Ethiopia
Ambassadors of Sweden to Sudan
Ambassadors of Sweden to South Africa
Ambassadors of Sweden to Iran
Ambassadors of Sweden to Afghanistan
Ambassadors of Sweden to Ireland
People from Stockholm
Uppsala University alumni
Commanders of the Order of the Polar Star
Commanders of the Order of the Dannebrog
Officers of the Order of Polonia Restituta
Recipients of orders, decorations, and medals of Ethiopia